The Lieutenancies Act 1997 (c. 23) is an Act of Parliament in the United Kingdom that defines areas that lord-lieutenants are appointed to in Great Britain. It came into force on 1 July 1997.

Creation of modern local government
Prior to the Local Government Act 1888, a Lord-Lieutenant was appointed to each of the counties. However this Act redefined the areas to be combinations of the new administrative counties and county boroughs. In practice the effect was quite minor, with only a few border differences between the historic and new administrative counties.

These areas changed little until the 1965 creation of Greater London and Huntingdon and Peterborough, which resulted in the abolition of the offices of Lord Lieutenant of Middlesex, Lord Lieutenant of the County of London and Lord Lieutenant of Huntingdonshire and the creation of the Lord Lieutenant of Greater London and Lord Lieutenant of Huntingdon and Peterborough.

Local government re-organisation

England
In 1974 county boroughs and several administrative counties were rearranged in England and Wales.  Lieutenancies were also redefined to use the new metropolitan and non-metropolitan counties directly. Many of the new Lieutenancies were not based on traditional counties in any way.

Many of these Lieutenancies did not last long, however. By the mid-1990s, another local government reorganisation was underway and many of the non-metropolitan counties in England were re-organised, resulting in the creation of unitary authorities.

At this time plans were drawn up for the Lieutenancies Act which would separate the Lieutenancy areas from being directly based on local government areas again. Although the term is not actually used in the Act, the areas it covers have come to be known as "ceremonial counties".

Scotland
The Local Government (Scotland) Act 1973 redefined the Lieutenancies not to be based on the then new Scottish Regions but as an approximation of the traditional counties in some places and entirely new creations in others.
	
Local government in Scotland was further reformed on 1 Apr 1996 into single-tier authorities designated as "Councils" but the lieutenancies remain mostly matching the pre-1973 counties and cities.

Wales
Local government in Wales was reorganised into a single-tier system on 1 Apr 1996 with the authorities designated as "Principal Councils" but nominally described as Cities, Boroughs or Counties. The lieutenancy areas remain based on the system of local government existing from 1974 to 1996.

Passage through Parliament

The Lieutenancies Bill was introduced in the House of Lords by the Lord Chancellor in January 1997, as a consolidation bill, to simplify and replace earlier legislation. It had its second reading soon afterwards. As a consolidation bill it was not subject to debate in the Commons at the second and third readings.

Lieutenancy areas

In England the lieutenancy areas are defined in terms of local government areas created by the Local Government Act 1972 as amended.
In Scotland the lieutenancy areas as defined by statutory instrument. The current such one being the Lord-Lieutenants (Scotland) Order 1996, Statutory Instrument 1996 No. 731 (S.83)
In Wales the lieutenancy areas are defined as the "preserved counties" — currently defined as combinations of local government areas by the Preserved Counties (Amendment to Boundaries) (Wales) Order 2003, Statutory Instrument 2003 No. 974 (W.133).

See also
Ceremonial counties of England
Lieutenancy areas of Scotland
Preserved counties of Wales
Lieutenancy areas of Northern Ireland

References

External links

Lord Lieutenancies
United Kingdom Acts of Parliament 1997
Local government legislation in England and Wales